Harshae Raniga (born 1 October 1994) is a New Zealand international footballer who plays as a defender for Auckland United.

Career

International
Raniga was a member of  the New Zealand under-17 side which won the 2011 OFC U-17 Championship. He was subsequently named in the squad for the 2011 FIFA U-17 World Cup.

He was called up to the under-23 side for the 2015 Pacific Games. New Zealand were eliminated in the semifinals after their win over Vanuatu was overturned by the OFC for fielding an ineligible player, causing the side to miss qualification for the 2016 Olympics.

Raniga was first called up to the New Zealand side for a friendly on 7 September 2015 against Myanmar in 2015. He made his debut briefly as a substitute, before coming from the field soon after due to injury in a 1–1 draw.

Honours

International
New Zealand
 OFC U-17 Championship: 2011

See also
 List of New Zealand international footballers

References

External links
 
 

Living people
1994 births
New Zealand association footballers
New Zealand international footballers
Association football defenders
Waitakere United players
Auckland City FC players
Auckland United FC players
New Zealand sportspeople of Indian descent
New Zealand Football Championship players